Blue Springs Encampments and Fortifications is the site of a Civil War military encampment in Bradley County, Tennessee. Union Army forces commanded by General William Tecumseh Sherman camped at this location between October 1863 and April 1865. Entrenchments built on the crests of ridges overlooking the camps are still visible on the site. Stone reinforcements are present in some sections of the entrenchments.

The property, which is now forest and farmland, was listed on the National Register of Historic Places in 1999. A Civil War Trails Program marker was placed near the site in 2016.

In Bradley County, Union troops led by Sherman also camped near Tasso on multiple occasions in 1863.

References

External links
 Blue Springs Fortifications, Southeast Tennessee Tourism Association

Archaeological sites on the National Register of Historic Places in Tennessee
Military facilities on the National Register of Historic Places in Tennessee
National Register of Historic Places in Bradley County, Tennessee
American Civil War on the National Register of Historic Places